Kids was a children's magazine (unrelated to the later Kids magazine of the 2000s) published in Cambridge, Massachusetts and later New York City from 1970 to 1975. Its aim was to create a magazine which was, as much as possible, created and edited by children themselves, with minimal adult supervision.

Its founding editors were Jenette Kahn and Jim Robinson, who were adults. However, later in its history, it had a teenager, Denise Yuspeh (age 15), as its managing editor. Originally, Kids was published in standard magazine size, but issues near the end of its run used a smaller page size.
The format was full color with a heavy cardboard stock glossy cover. The covers were exceptionally well designed and stylistic of the 1970s. 
Kids accepted contributions of stories, poems, essays, puzzles, artwork, cartoons and photography from children aged 5 through 15, and held frequent contests for the most creative photographs, signs, buttons, etc. Monthly newspaper-like features included "Don't You Hate..." (modeled on a MAD Magazine feature of that title), Horace Cope's Horror-Scope, the Swap Shop, Letters to the Editor, and a "Dear Abby" style advice column called "Dear Dr. Loker," which was initiated by students at Loker Elementary School in Wayland, Massachusetts. The magazine also conducted interviews with children around the nation on such topics as pets, parents, who decides on bedtimes, what it was like to be twins, etc. it
Also included Reina Heim's stylistic cartoons.

Unlike most children's magazines, Kids paid its contributors — $5 or $6 plus three free copies of the issue in which their work appeared — and returned rejected contributions if a self-addressed, stamped envelope was provided.

The magazine's illustrators included twelve-year-old Ray Billingsley, who went on to create the syndicated newspaper comic Curtis, Jim Salicrup who was editor for Marvel Comics in the 80's, and fourteen-year-old Tom Gammill, who later wrote for Saturday Night Live, Seinfeld, The Critic, The Wonder Years, and It's Garry Shandling's Show with Max Pross.

Kahn was later involved in Scholastic Press's Dynamite! magazine, which had some similarities in format and content, although it was produced by an adult staff. Eventually she became president and editor-in-chief of DC Comics and MAD Magazine

See also 
Stone Soup (magazine)

Children's magazines published in the United States
Defunct magazines published in the United States
Magazines established in 1970
Magazines disestablished in 1975
Magazines published in Boston
Magazines published in New York City